The National Women's Soccer League Team of the Month is a monthly soccer award given to individual players in the National Women's Soccer League. The NWSL Media Association, composed of journalists who regularly cover the league, select a Best XI of players who were deemed to have put in the best performances over the past month. This award began in 2017.

Winners

2017

2018

2019

2021

2022 

Awarded as "Best XI of the Month".

Multiple winners

See also 

 List of sports awards honoring women
 NWSL Player of the Week
 NWSL Rookie of the Month
 NWSL Player of the Month
 NWSL awards
 NWSL records and statistics
 Women's soccer in the United States

References

External links 
 

Team
Association football player of the month awards
Awards established in 2017
Team
Lists of women's association football players
Association football player non-biographical articles